KTI or kti may refer to:

Karachi Transport Ittehad, a coalition of owners of minibuses, private buses, rickshaws and taxis in Karachi, Sindh, Pakistan
Kitchen Table International, a defunct fictitious computer company
Kumasi Technical Institute, a technical school in the Ashanti Region of Ghana
KTI, the IATA airport code for Kratié Airport, Cambodia
KTI, the Indian Railways station code for Kanti railway station, Bihar, India
kti, the ISO 639-3 code for the North Muyu language in West Papua